Kings & Queens is the ninth studio album by Christian rock band Audio Adrenaline, the only Audio Adrenaline album with Kevin Max as the lead singer and the last album with bassist and founding member Will McGinniss. The album was released on March 12, 2013, and was the first album after their comeback and with the Fair Trade Services label. Kings & Queens garnered critical acclaim from music critics, and has seen chart successes.

Critical reception

Audio Adrenaline's Kings & Queens garnered critical acclaim from the 13 music critics that reviewed and rated the album. The work got two five-star perfect reviews from CM Addict and New Release Tuesday. The album has received four four-and-a-half-stars-out-of-five by Christian Music Review, Christian Music Zine and Jesus Freak Hideout's John DiBiase, Louder Than the Music, Worship Leader. The effort got three four-stars-out-of-five from Allmusic, CCM Magazine, Indie Vision Music and The Phantom Tollbooth. The project got one lone three-and-a-half-stars-out-out-five review by Roger Gelwicks of Jesus Freak Hideout.

CM Addict's Andrew Funderburk called it "possibly the greatest comeback project in Christian music today" that "doesn’t slow its pace until the project ends", and has the message of "empowerment for us to rise to the position that Jesus Christ has made for us and to live in that position of our identity in Him." Sarah Fine of New Release Tuesday vowed that the album was "On point in every aspect, there isn't a single weak song, each one holding immense potential to become a hit. While it varies in style and sound, the consistent theme of redemption throughout ties it together, making it an album you'll want to listen to again and again. Older fans will be surprised to hear how much of the original sound has crossed over into this new formation, yet old and new listeners alike will enjoy the exciting melodic prospects being presented here."

Daniel Edgeman of Christian Music Review found that "All of the songs have a great message. I am very impressed at the depth of the lyrics. After listening to this album I breathed a big breath of relief, Audio Adrenaline is back." Christian Music Zine's Emily Kjonaas foretold that "Kings & Queens turned out to be a fresh album that will keep both old and new fans alike." Jono Davies of Louder Than the Music found that "As a collection of songs, Audio Adrenaline have really surpassed themselves here. The lyrics and melodies sound fresh, which makes the album stand out compared to many other albums around at the moment. There is a mix of rock tracks and modern synth tracks, making Kings & Queens an album well worth checking out." DiBiase of Jesus Freak Hideout found that "Kings and Queens is Audio Adrenaline with a new voice for a new time. It's looking to be one of the best pop rock records in recent memory, but diehard fans who can't imagine any other vocalist besides Stuart", but DiBiase criticized that "The only thing that may be missing from Kings and Queens would be some of the more raw rock leanings the band has displayed through most of their albums." Lastly, DiBiase proclaimed that "Kings and Queens takes more of a Don't Censor Me approach with a more polished pop sound. So, band name aside, for the CCM realm, this just may be a match made in heaven." At Worship Leader, Greg Wallace found that "as a band with a strong pedigree delivers on their potential."

Allmusic's David Jeffries found that when he "add[ed] it all up and this is a comeback worth coming back to and another highlight in the band's discography." Grace S. Aspinwall of CCM Magazine wrote that "In the recent tradition of music heavy-weight comebacks, Audio A retains its trademark pop, upbeat style, but with the addition of Kevin Max on lead vocals, is unlike anything we've heard before. A solid album from start to finish, it is most decidedly a new sound. The techno-based rock ambiance provides a solid foundation that is then layered with heartfelt lyrics, tight musicianship and Kevin's distinct voice, which only faintly resonates with the tight vibrato that hallmarked the dcTalk years." Indie Vision Music's Jonathan Andre called it "one of the greatest comebacks in Christian music history!" Bert Saraco of The Phantom Tollbooth affirmed that the album "will not disappoint" because the band "are sounding more energetic and confident than ever", and in doing so "manages to be commercial without being trite." At Cross Rhythms, Tony Cummings felt that this album was "an excellent launch pad." Gelwicks noted that "Kings & Queens grabbed the role of the most historic album to drop in 2013, and thankfully, it largely delivers. Audio Adrenaline's currently lineup still have a lot of work to do to build a unique identity as a new band, and though Kings & Queens is a solid first attempt to reach that goal, they can afford to take larger artistic risks in the near future."

Commercial performance
On March 30, 2013, the album was the No. 70 most sold album on the Billboard 200 chart, and the No. 4 most sold Christian Albums chart.

Track listing

Personnel

Audio Adrenaline
Kevin Max — lead vocals
Will McGinniss — bass guitar, background vocals
Jared Byers — drums
Jason Walker — keyboards, background vocals
Dave Ghazarian — lead guitars

Additional musicians

 Blanca Callahan – additional vocals on "20:17 (Raise the Banner)"
 Casey Brown – drums
 Stu G – guitar
 Ricky Jackson – bass guitar, keyboards, programming, backing vocals
 Steven Kadar – drums
 Dwayne Larring – guitar, keyboards, percussion, backing vocals
 Tim Lauer – keyboards, programming, percussion
 Tony Lucio – bass guitar
 DJ Maj – DJ
 Seth Mosley – guitar, bass guitar, keyboards, programming, backing vocals
 Ben Phillips – drums
 Arie Tidwell – drums

Production

 Seth Mosley – producer (1–6, 8, 10), engineer, mixing (1, 4, 5, 8, 10)
 Dwayne Larring – producer (7, 9)
 X O'Connor – engineer
 Buckley Miller – engineer
 Neal Avron – mixing (2)
 Chris Stephens – mixing (3, 6)
 Rich Renken – mixing at Rev4 Audio, Burbank (7, 9)
 Wes Campbell – executive producer
 Mark Stuart – executive producer
 Dave Wagner – executive producer
 Jeremy Cowart – pthography
 Jason Barrett – art direction, design

Charts

References 

2013 albums
Audio Adrenaline albums
Fair Trade Services albums